Kim Jin-seo (born 19 December 1994) is a South Korean footballer who plays as a centre back and is currently a free agent.

References

External links 

1994 births
Living people
South Korean footballers
South Korean expatriate sportspeople in Vietnam
South Korean expatriate footballers
South Korean expatriate sportspeople in Hong Kong
Expatriate footballers in Hong Kong
Association football central defenders
Hoang Anh Gia Lai FC players
Hoi King SA players
V.League 1 players
Hong Kong Premier League players